After the dissolution of the Soviet Union (USSR) in December 1991, about 25 million ethnic Russians in post-Soviet states found themselves living outside of Russia.

All former Soviet citizens had a time window within which they could transfer their former Soviet citizenship to Russian citizenship. Where they did not exercise that choice, their resulting citizenship status outside Russia varied by state: from no perceivable change in status – as in Belarus – to becoming permanently resident "non-citizens" – as in Estonia and Latvia, which restricted citizenship to their pre-World War II citizens and their offspring (regardless of ethnic group) upon restoration of their independence in continuity with their sovereign identities prior to June 1940.

However, most people in practice found the "time window" concept not feasible, as the citizenship issue linked closely to the issue of owning property owned by the state before privatization. For many people, a change of citizenship would actually mean relocating and leaving behind everything - or most of what they had previously owned or been able to access. 

 the largest ethnic Russian diaspora populations outside Russia live in Ukraine and other countries. The populations involved include those in: Ukraine (about 9 million), Kazakhstan (about 3.6 million in 2016), Belarus (about 1.5 million), Uzbekistan (about 650,000) and Kyrgyzstan (about 600,000).

In June 2006 Russian President Vladimir Putin announced a plan to introduce national policy aiming at encouraging ethnic Russian immigration to Russia. 

 Does not include Abkhazia (2011 census: 22,077 Russians or 9.1% of the population) or South Ossetia (2007 estimate: 2,100 Russians or 3.0% of the population).

 In Turkmenistan, there were estimated to be at most 150,000 ethnic Russians as of 2007, or under 2% of the population. In Uzbekistan the same year, the Russian population stood at some 800,000 people or under 4% of the country.

References

Russian diaspora in Asia
Russian diaspora in Europe
Post-Soviet states